Panshikar is a surname. Notable people with the surname include: 

Aparna Panshikar, Hindustani classical vocalist
Prabhakar Panshikar (1931–2011), Indian actor
Raghunandan Panshikar (born 1963), Hindustani classical vocalist, son of Prabhakar

Indian surnames